Escatawpa is an unincorporated community and census-designated place (CDP) in Jackson County, Mississippi, United States. It is part of the Pascagoula Metropolitan Statistical Area. The population was 3,254 at the 2020 census.

History
The community takes its name from the Escatawpa River. A post office called Escatawpa was established in 1885.

In 1990, the original center of Escatawpa was annexed into the city of Moss Point, located just to the south. The adjoining unincorporated area north of Moss Point is the current Escatawpa census-designated place. The city was devastated by Hurricane Katrina on August 29, 2005. Escatawpa is the home of the rock band 3 Doors Down. Escatawpa is 6 miles north of Pascagoula. In 1906, the population of Escatawpa was 500.

Geography
The Escatawpa CDP is in eastern Jackson County on the east side of the Pascagoula River. It is bordered to the south by the city of Moss Point. The original community of Escatawpa, now a neighborhood in Moss Point, was centered just north of present-day Interstate 10. Mississippi Highway 613 is the main road through the center of Escatawpa, and four-lane Mississippi Highway 63 forms the eastern edge of the community.

Demographics

2020 census

Note: the US Census treats Hispanic/Latino as an ethnic category. This table excludes Latinos from the racial categories and assigns them to a separate category. Hispanics/Latinos can be of any race.

2000 Census
As of the census of 2000, there were 115 people, 41 households, and 38 families residing in the CDP. The population density was 1,059.0 people per square mile (403.7/km2). There were 42 housing units at an average density of 386.8/sq mi (147.4/km2). The racial makeup of the CDP was 99.13% White, and 0.87% from two or more races.

There were 41 households, out of which 41.5% had children under the age of 18 living with them, 85.4% were married couples living together, 9.8% had a female householder with no husband present, and 4.9% were non-families. 4.9% of all households were made up of individuals, and none had someone living alone who was 65 years of age or older. The average household size was 2.80 and the average family size was 2.90.

In the CDP, the population was spread out, with 25.2% under the age of 18, 9.6% from 18 to 24, 30.4% from 25 to 44, 21.7% from 45 to 64, and 13.0% who were 65 years of age or older. The median age was 38 years. For every 100 females, there were 76.9 males. For every 100 females age 18 and over, there were 75.5 males.

The median income for a household in the CDP was $30,125, and the median income for a family was $30,125. Males had a median income of $22,361 versus $0 for females. The per capita income for the CDP was $10,243. None of the population and none of the families were below the poverty line.

As of the census of 2000, there were 3,566 people, 1,310 households, and 1,002 families residing in the CDP. The population density was 552.8 people per square mile (213.5/km2). There were 1,434 housing units at an average density of 222.3/sq mi (85.8/km2). The racial makeup of the CDP was 80.45% African American, 17.64% White, 0.31% Native American, 0.73% Asian, 0.08% Pacific Islander, 0.06% from other races, and 0.73% from two or more races. Hispanic or Latino of any race were 0.59% of the population.

Households
There were 1,310 households, out of which 35.0% had children under the age of 18 living with them, 57.2% were married couples living together, 14.1% had a female householder with no husband present, and 23.5% were non-families. 20.3% of all households were made up of individuals, and 4.7% had someone living alone who was 65 years of age or older. The average household size was 2.67 and the average family size was 3.06.

Ages
In the CDP, the population was spread out, with 25.5% under the age of 18, 9.1% from 18 to 24, 29.5% from 25 to 44, 26.8% from 45 to 64, and 9.0% who were 65 years of age or older. The median age was 36 years. For every 100 females, there were 101.1 males. For every 100 females age 18 and over, there were 97.8 males.

Income
The median income for a household in the CDP was $41,101, and the median income for a family was $48,942. Males had a median income of $35,050 versus $20,762 for females. The per capita income for the CDP was $16,850. About 5.5% of families and 8.7% of the population were below the poverty line, including 7.2% of those under age 18 and 14.0% of those age 65 or over.

Education
Most of Escatawpa is served by the Moss Point School District while a small portion is in the Jackson County School District. The Moss Point district includes two elementary schools, one middle school, and one high school. Students in Escatawpa attend schools in Moss Point, Mississippi.

Schools
 Moss Point High School
 Magnolia Middle School
 Escatawpa Upper Elementary School (Grades 3–5)
 Kreole Primary School (Grades K-2)

Notable people
Brad Arnold, 3 Doors Down singer/drummer
3 Doors Down, rock band
Wendell Davis, professional football player
Jack G. Hanson, recipient of the Medal of Honor

References

Census-designated places in Mississippi
Census-designated places in Jackson County, Mississippi
Pascagoula metropolitan area
Mississippi placenames of Native American origin